Ihor Oleksandrovych Terekhov (born 14 January 1967) is a Ukrainian politician who is serving as the Mayor of Kharkiv since 11 November 2021.
He ascended to the mayoralty on 24 December 2020 following Hennadiy Kernes' death due to COVID-19 complications. The Kharkiv early mayoral election was held on 31 October 2021, and Terekhov was declared the winner of the election with 50.66% of the votes.

Biography
Terekhov was born on 14 January 1967 in Kharkiv.

After which he remained at the university as a research intern. Terekhov refereed 22 Ukrainian Premier League games from the 1992–93 season up until the 1994–95 season.

Terekhov worked in the private sector from 1994 to 1997.

From 1999 to 2006, Terekhov worked as a civil servant of the economic department of the Kharkiv City Council. In 2006, Terekhov graduated from the National Academy for Public Administration.

In the 2006 Ukrainian parliamentary election, Terekhov was a candidate for the Our Ukraine Bloc, but was not elected. In 2007 was appointed the Deputy Head of Governor of Kharkiv Oblast Arsen Avakov.

In 2010, Terekhov became Deputy Mayor of Kharkiv and in 2015 First Deputy Mayor. Following the 2010 Ukrainian local elections he became leader of the deputy faction of the Kharkiv city council of Opposition Bloc – Truth and Deeds.

In the October 2015 Kharkiv local election, Terekhov was elected a deputy of the Kharkiv City Council a candidate of Revival. In the October 2020 Kharkiv local election, he was in second place on the party list re-elected for the party Kernes Bloc — Successful Kharkiv, the party of then incumbent Mayor Hennadiy Kernes. On 17 December 2020 Kernes died in Berlin of COVID-19. After the death of Kernes his duties were performed by City Council Secretary Terekhov. The Kharkiv City Council terminated the powers of Kernes on 24 December 2020 On 30 March 2021 the Ukrainian parliament set the date for the Kharkiv early mayoral election on 31 October 2021. In this election Kernes Bloc — Successful Kharkiv nominated Terekhov as its mayoral candidate. The election commission declared Terekhov the winner of the election with 50.66% of the votes. Mikhail Dobkin finished the race in second place with 28.4% of the vote. Observers reported numerous irregularities in the election and tried to annul the results of 9 polling stations through court. At an extraordinary session of the Kharkiv City Council on 11 November 2021 Terekhov was sworn in as the new Mayor of Kharkiv.

Terekhov has the title of "Honored Economist of Ukraine". He divorced Olena Vynnyk in 2014.

See also
 List of mayors of Kharkiv

References

External links

Living people
1967 births
21st-century Ukrainian politicians
Politicians from Kharkiv
National Academy of State Administration alumni
Revival (Ukraine) politicians
Ukrainian football referees
Mayors of Kharkiv
Laureates of the Honorary Diploma of the Verkhovna Rada of Ukraine
Recipients of the Honorary Diploma of the Cabinet of Ministers of Ukraine